Willem Vrelant (died c. 1481/1482) was a Dutch book illuminator.

Life
He is first registered in 1449, when an illuminator from Vreeland named Willem Backer obtained citizenship of Utrecht. He may have lived in Utrecht for years, as in 1450 he finished there the Hours of William de Montfort. From 1454 to 1481 he is recorded as a member of the Bruges guild of bookmakers. His large and productive workshop produced (among others) a book of hours which is now in Baltimore (1455–60), the Hours of Isabella of Castille (c.1460), the Chronicles of Hainaut (1468) and individual miniatures in the Hours of Mary of Burgundy (c.1480).

See also 
Book of Hours of Leonor de la Vega - work imputed to Vrelant
Très Riches Heures du Duc de Berry - famous French book of hours
A Man Praying to the Holy 
Solomon Praying to the Holy Spirit

Bibliography
 Ingo F. Walther, Norbert Wolf: Meisterwerke der Buchmalerei, S. 480. Köln u.a., Taschen 2005,

References

External links
 Widener 5 Book of Hours, use of Paris at OPenn
Vrelant, Willem at the RKD.

Year of birth unknown
1482 deaths
Manuscript illuminators
Early Netherlandish painters
People from Loenen
Artists from Utrecht
Artists from Bruges